Luis Arroyo (born June 13, 1954) is a former Democratic member of the Illinois House of Representatives, representing the 3rd District from his appointment in 2006 until his resignation in 2019.

Early life and education
Arroyo was born in Corozal, Puerto Rico, moving to Chicago at age 13. He attended Pulaski Elementary School and Tuley High School (now Clemente High School) in Chicago.  Before being appointed to the state legislature, Arroyo owned a restaurant and was a member of the International Union of Bricklayers and Allied Craftworkers.

Career
Arroyo was appointed as Illinois State Representative for the 3rd district in 2006. He was re-elected six times, running unopposed in the primary and general elections in four election cycles. From 2017 onwards, Arroyo served as Assistant Majority Leader in the Illinois House of Representatives.

In late October 2019, the US Attorney's Office charged Arroyo with one count of federal program bribery, alleging that Arroyo offered "a bribe to a fellow state lawmaker in an effort to influence and reward the lawmaker for supporting legislation that would benefit Arroyo’s private lobbying client". Arroyo announced his resignation on November 1, shortly before a legislative committee was scheduled to meet to consider ejecting him from the state house after being arrested for bribery.

On November 15, 2019, Eva-Dina Delgado was appointed to serve the remainder of Arroyo's term. The appointment was controversial as Arroyo also served as 36th Ward committeeman and thus received votes in the appointment process. Despite calls to abstain from the process, he allowed neighboring 30th Ward committeeman Ariel Reboyras to act as his proxy, receiving criticism from several other political figures including 35th Ward alderman and committeeman Carlos Ramirez-Rosa and Illinois House Speaker Michael Madigan.

On November 3, 2021, Arroyo pled guilty to the federal wire fraud charge and was sentenced in May 2022 to 5 years in prison.

Personal life 
His son, Luis Arroyo Jr., is a member of the Cook County Board of Commissioners.

Electoral history

References

External links
Representative Luis Arroyo (D) 3rd District at the Illinois General Assembly
By session: 100th, 99th, 98th, 97th, 96th, 95th, 94th
 
Luis Arroyo at Illinois House Democrats

Democratic Party members of the Illinois House of Representatives
1954 births
American politicians of Puerto Rican descent
Living people
People from Corozal, Puerto Rico
Politicians from Chicago
21st-century American politicians
Hispanic and Latino American state legislators in Illinois
Illinois politicians convicted of crimes